Lucy Maynard Salmon (July 27, 1853 – February 14, 1927) was an American historian. She was a professor of history at Vassar College from 1889 until her death. She was the first woman to be a member of the executive committee of the American Historical Association. She published widely in historical journals and general magazines,  and was highly active in civic affairs, supporting civil service reform and world and women suffrage.

Education and early career 
Salmon was born in Fulton, Oswego County, New York, to George and Maria Clara Maynard Salmon. Her mother, Maria Clara Maynard, was the first principal of the Fulton Female Seminary. Salmon attended Falley Seminary, in Fulton. She moved to Ann Arbor in 1871, and graduated from Ann Arbor High School in 1872. She received her bachelor's degree in history from the University of Michigan, Ann Arbor, in 1876. Salmon served as assistant principal and later principal of McGregor High School in McGregor, Iowa, from 1876-1881. Salmon received her M.A. from the University of Michigan's School of Political Science in 1883. A version of her master's thesis, "History of the Appointing Power of the President," was published in the first volume of the Papers of the American Historical Association in 1886. In 1886 she attended Bryn Mawr where she studied with Woodrow Wilson. The following year, Vassar College hired Salmon to establish its history department and serve as Associate Professor of History. She was appointed a full professor at the end of her second year, in 1889.

Professional service 
Salmon joined the fledgling American Historical Association (AHA) in 1885. In 1897 the Executive Committee of the AHA asked Salmon to serve on the Association’s Committee of Seven, which largely defined the way history would be taught at the high school level. She was the only woman to serve on the committee. As part of her work on the Committee, Salmon traveled to Germany to study the way history was taught in the secondary schools there. She delivered her findings to the AHA in an address in December 1897, and they were also published as an appendix to the Committee's report The Study of History in Schools.

In the late nineteenth and early twentieth centuries, Salmon was one of the few women historians to speak regularly at the annual meetings of the AHA.  In 1915 the Association’s members elected Salmon to serve on the Executive Council; she was the first woman to serve on the committee.

Career 
Salmon was a member of the "new social history" of her time. She believed that political history had been overemphasized, at the expense of other topics. She considered domestic documents, such as family cookbooks, as historical sources as valuable as the Constitution or Bill of Rights. Not only did she work with these sources herself, but she encouraged the undergraduate students she taught at Vassar College to consult primary sources themselves and to look at their home communities as historical subjects. Rather than only teaching historical facts, she taught her students how to do the work of a historian. In order to conduct seminars, despite having been denied permission by the College, she invited students to her rooms twice a week for informal discussions.
In 1912, Salmon received an honorary Doctor of Human Letters from Colgate University, and an honorary Doctor of Letters from the University of Michigan in 1926. In February 1926, a group of Vassar College alumnae and friends of Salmon established the Lucy Maynard Salmon Fund, which enabled her to continue her research. The Fund continues to endow Vassar faculty research.

Adelaide Underhill, a Vassar graduate who returned in 1892 as head librarian for the college, worked closely with Salmon to improve the library. The two women were "lifelong companions", exchanging frequent letters when apart and sharing a house in Poughkeepsie from 1901 until Salmon's death from a stroke in 1927.

Works 
History of the Appointing Power of the President (1886)
“The Teaching of History in Academies and Colleges,” in Woman and Higher Education (1893)
Domestic Service (1897)
Progress in the Household (1906)
The Newspaper and Historian (1923)
The Newspaper and Authority (1923)
Why Is History Rewritten? (1929)
Historical Material (posthumous), Adelaide Underhill, ed. (1933)
History and the texture of modern life, Nicholas Adams and Bonnie G. Smith, eds. (2001)

References

Further reading 
 Bohan, Chara Haeussler. Go to the Sources: Lucy Maynard Salmon and the Teaching of History. New York: P. Lang, 2004.
Bohan, Chara H. "Lucy Maynard Salmon: Progressive historian, teacher, and democrat." in  M. S. Crocco & O. L. Davis, Jr. (Eds.) 'Bending the future to their will’: Civic women, social education, and democracy (1999)  pp. 47–72.  Online
 Brown, Louise Fargo. Apostle of Democracy; the Life of Lucy Maynard Salmon. New York and London: Harper & Bros., 1943.
 Salmon, Lucy Maynard. History and the Texture of Modern Life: Selected Essays. Edited by Nicholas Adams and Bonnie G Smith. Philadelphia, Pa.: Univ. of Pennsylvania Press, 2001.

External links

1853 births
1927 deaths
Vassar College faculty
Historians from New York (state)
University of Michigan College of Literature, Science, and the Arts alumni
Historians of the United States
American women historians
Daughters of the American Revolution people
People from Fulton County, New York
19th-century American historians
19th-century American women writers
20th-century American historians
20th-century American women writers
Writers from Ann Arbor, Michigan
Historians from Michigan
LGBT historians
LGBT academics